The thick-billed kingbird (Tyrannus crassirostris) is a large bird in the family Tyrannidae, the tyrant flycatchers.

Distribution and habitat
This bird breeds from southeastern Arizona and extreme southwestern New Mexico in the United States and northern Sonora (the Madrean sky islands) through the western and western-coastal ranges in Mexico, south to western Guatemala. Thick-billed kingbirds usually occur in arid or partly arid areas in streamside riparian canyons, or open areas near water. They are particularly fond of sycamore woodland edges.

Description
Adults are dusky olive-brown on the upperparts with light underparts; they have a long dark brown or black tail. The underside is a dull white to pale yellow. They have a yellow patch on their crown, but is not visible very often. The bill on this species, for which it is named, is rather large and stocky compared to other members of this group and it is one of this kingbird's most distinguishing characteristics. The call is a loud, whistled pwaareeet.

Breeding
They make a nest in a tree branch, usually close to the trunk above 6 meters high. The female lays three to five eggs.

Migration
These birds are mostly resident in territories year round, but birds in the United States will retreat southward for the winter.

Diet
They wait on an open perch usually rather high or on top of the tree and fly out to catch insects in flight, (hawking).

References

External links
Videos, photos and sounds - Internet Bird Collection
Photos - VIREO

Tyrannus (genus)
Birds of Mexico
Birds of the United States
Birds of Guatemala
Natural history of the Mexican Plateau
Birds described in 1826